Joe Lieberman (born February 24, 1942) is an American politician, having served as a United States Senator from Connecticut from 1989 to 2013. A former member of the Democratic Party, he was the party's nominee for Vice President in the 2000 election. Currently he is an Independent.

1980 congressional election 
Connecticut's 3rd congressional district, 1980:
 Lawrence DeNardis (R) - 117,024 (52.33%)
 Joe Lieberman (D) - 103,903 (46.46%)
 Joelle Fishman (Citizens) - 2,711 (1.21%)
 Write-in - 10 (0.00%)

U.S. Senate elections (1988-2000)
United States Senate election in Connecticut, 1988: 
 Joe Lieberman (D) - 688,499 (49.76%)
 Lowell P. Weicker, Jr. (R) (inc.) - 678,454 (49.04%)
 Howard A. Grayson, Jr. (LBT) - 12,409 (0.90%)
 Melissa M. Fisher (New Alliance) - 4,154 (0.30%)
 Others - 10 (0.00%)

United States Senate election in Connecticut, 1994:
 Joe Lieberman (D/A Connecticut Party) (inc.) - 723,842 (67.04%)
 Jerry Labriola (R) - 334,833 (31.01%)
 Bruce Johnson (Concerned Citizens) - 20,989 (1.94%)

United States Senate election in Connecticut, 2000:
 Joe Lieberman (D) (inc.) - 828,902 (63.21%)
 Philip A. Giordano (R) - 448,077 (34.17%)
 William Kozak, Jr. (Concerned Citizens) - 25,509 (1.95%)
 Wildey J. Moore (LBT) - 8,773 (0.67%)

Presidential politics 
2000 Democratic National Convention (Vice Presidential tally):
 Joe Lieberman - 4,337 (100.00%)

2000 United States presidential election:
 George W. Bush/Dick Cheney (R) - 50,460,110 (47.9%) and 271 electoral votes (30 states carried)
 Al Gore/Joe Lieberman (D) - 51,003,926 (48.4%) and 266 electoral votes (20 states and D.C. carried)
 Abstaining - 1 electoral vote (Washington, D.C. faithless elector)
 Ralph Nader/Winona LaDuke (Green) - 2,883,105 (2.7%)
 Pat Buchanan/Ezola Foster (Reform) - 449,225 (0.4%)
 Harry Browne/Art Olivier (Libertarian) - 384,516 (0.4%)
 Howard Phillips/Curtis Frazier (Constitution) - 98,022 (0.1%)
 John Hagelin/Nat Goldhaber (Natural Law) - 83,702 (0.1%)
 Others - 54,652 (0.1%)

2004 Democratic presidential primaries:
 John Kerry - 9,930,497 (60.98%)
 John Edwards - 3,162,337 (19.42%)
 Howard Dean - 903,460 (5.55%)
 Dennis Kucinich - 620,242 (3.81%)
 Wesley Clark - 547,369 (3.36%)
 Al Sharpton - 380,865 (2.34%)
 Joe Lieberman - 280,940 (1.73%)
 Uncommitted - 157,953 (0.97%)
 Lyndon LaRouche - 103,731 (0.64%)
 Carol Moseley Braun - 98,469 (0.61%)
 Dick Gephardt - 63,902 (0.39%)
 Scattering - 12,525 (0.08%)

2006 U.S. Senate election 
Connecticut Democratic Senatorial Convention, May 20, 2006:
 Joe Lieberman (inc.) - 1,004 (66.53%)
 Ned Lamont - 505 (33.47%)

Democratic primary for the United States Senate from Connecticut, August 8, 2006:
 Ned Lamont - 146,587 (51.79%)
 Joe Lieberman (inc.) - 136,468 (48.21%)

United States Senate election in Connecticut, 2006:
 Joe Lieberman (Connecticut for Lieberman) (inc.) - 564,095 (49.71%)
 Ned Lamont (D) - 450,844 (39.73%)
 Alan Schlesinger (R) - 109,198 (9.62%)
 Ralph Ferrucci (Green) - 5,922 (0.52%)
 Timothy A. Knibbs (Concerned Citizens) - 4,638 (0.41%)
 Carl E. Vassar (I) (write-in) - 80 (0.01%)

References

Lieberman, Joe
Joe Lieberman